Sidalcea hartwegii is a species of flowering plant in the mallow family known by the common names valley checkerbloom and Hartweg's checkerbloom.

Distribution
The plant is endemic to California, where it grows in the Sacramento Valley and adjacent foothills of the California Coast Ranges to the west, and of the Sierra Nevada to the east. It can be found in oak woodland and grassland habitats below , sometimes on serpentine soils.

Description
The leaf blades are deeply divided into five to seven narrow linear lobes.

The inflorescence is a clustered panicle of four to six flowers, each with five purplish pink petals about 2 centimeters long. The bloom period is May and June.

References

External links
Calflora Database: Sidalcea hartwegii (Hartweg sidalcea,  Hartweg's checkerbloom, Valley checkerbloom)
Jepson Manual eFlora (TJM2) treatment of Sidalcea hartwegii
USDA Plants Profile for Sidalcea hartwegii
UC CalPhotos gallery: Sidalcea hartwegii

hartwegii
Endemic flora of California
Natural history of the California chaparral and woodlands
Natural history of the Central Valley (California)
Natural history of the California Coast Ranges
Flora of the Sierra Nevada (United States)
~
Flora without expected TNC conservation status